Kevin Grob (born 24 June 1992) is a German footballer who plays as a midfielder for SG Eiterfeld/Leimbach.

Career
Grob made his professional debut for Carl Zeiss Jena in the 3. Liga on 14 May 2011, coming on as a substitute in the 78th minute for René Eckardt in the 2–3 away loss against VfB Stuttgart II.

References

External links
 Profile at DFB.de
 Profile at kicker.de

1992 births
Living people
Sportspeople from Jena
Footballers from Thuringia
German footballers
Association football midfielders
FC Carl Zeiss Jena players
3. Liga players